Candace was the title for female rulers of the ancient African kingdom of Kush.

Candace may also refer to:

 4899 Candace, a main belt asteroid
 Candace Stål, 1870, a genus of tessaratomidae bug
 Candace Dana, 1846, a synonym for a genus of copepods, Candacia
 Candace (given name)—including a list of people, real and fictional with this name
 Gratien Candace (1873-1953), a politician from Guadeloupe
 Candace (show), a political podcast hosted by Candace Owens